The Switch is a 1963 British crime drama film directed by Peter Maxwell, and starring Anthony Steel, Zena Marshall and Conrad Phillips. The film concerns a criminal gang that smuggles watches into the UK by hiding them in the petrol tank of a woman's car. It was Susan Shaw's last film.

Plot
Caroline Markham (Zena Marshall) is abducted by a criminal gang because she knows too much. The gang specialises in smuggling wrist watches into the UK. Bill Craddock (Anthony Steel), a customs officer, attempts to rescue Caroline.

Cast

 Anthony Steel as Bill Craddock
 Zena Marshall as Caroline Markham
 Conrad Phillips as John Curry
 Dermot Walsh as Inspector Tomlinson
 Susan Shaw as Search Officer
 Dawn Beret as Janice Lampton
 Jerry Desmonde as Customs Chief
 Arnold Diamond as Jean Lecraze
 Raymond Smith as Mandreos	
  Tom Bowman as Polovski	
  Arthur Ludgrove as Harry Lewis	
 Gordon Boyd as Jack Knighton
  Ken Goodlet as Read	
 Rose Alba as Bill's Secretary	
  Anthony Parker as Police Inspector	
 Desmond Cullum-Jones as Merrall
 Yvonne Marsh as Nurse
 Jimmy Hanley as himself

Production
This was Anthony Steel's first film in Britain in a number of years, following his move to Rome.

Recent assessment of the film
According to TV Guide, "Audiences are likely to check their watches frequently during this lifeless crime thriller."

References

External links

1963 films
1963 crime drama films
British crime drama films
Films directed by Peter Maxwell
Films shot at Pinewood Studios
Films scored by Eric Spear
1960s English-language films
1960s British films